Dahlica fennicella is a species of moth, belonging to the genus Dahlica.

It is native to Northern Europe.

References

Psychidae
Moths described in 1980